Kipras Petrauskas (November 23, 1885 as Ciprijonas Petrauskas – January 17, 1968) was a Lithuanian operatic tenor (created around 80 roles), professor, and Lithuanian Association of Artists member. The national opera foundation is associated with him. He was married to Elena Žalinkevičaitė-Petrauskienė. In 1942, he was asked to hide a Jewish baby girl, Dana Pomeranz, which he and his wife agreed to do. To hide the girl better, he and his wife left the city, moving first to a Lithuanian village, and later to Austria and then Germany. In 1947, they came back to Lithuania, found Dana's parents, and gave her back to them.

In 1999, Petrauskas and his wife were recognized by Yad Vashem as two of the Righteous Among the Nations.

Kipras Petrauskas made his first recordings for Vox (Berlin 1922), then Odeon (1926 and 1928) and finally Columbia (Vilnius, ca. 1933).

Gallery

References

 Rainer E. Lotz, Axel Weggen, Oliver Wurl und Christian Zwarg: Discographie der deutschen Gesangsaufnahmen Band 4, Birgit Lotz Verlag, Bonn 2005 

1885 births
1968 deaths
20th-century Lithuanian male singers
20th-century male opera singers
Lithuanian opera singers
Lithuanian Righteous Among the Nations
Lithuanian tenors
Operatic tenors
Burials at Rasos Cemetery